Hanna Beattie (born June 1, 1995) is an American ice hockey forward, currently playing for the Connecticut Whale in the Premier Hockey Federation (PHF).

Career 

Across 103 games with Williams College, Beattie put up 56 points. In 2014, she was named NESCAC Rookie of the Year and first team All American defender. She was named to the 2015 New England Hockey Writers Division II-III All-Star team.

In 2017, she signed her first professional contract with the Connecticut Whale. After failing to score any points in her first two seasons with the Whale, she would score 6 points in 22 games in the 2019–20 NWHL season. She was named to the 2020 NWHL All-Star Game as a replacement for Jordan Brickner.

Career Statistics

References

External links 
 

1995 births
Living people
Connecticut Whale (PHF) players
Williams College alumni
Ice hockey players from New Jersey
People from Readington Township, New Jersey
Pingry School alumni
Sportspeople from Hunterdon County, New Jersey
American women's ice hockey players
21st-century American women
Williams Ephs athletes